Anya von Bremzen is a three-time James Beard Award-winning culinary writer. She was born in  Soviet Russia, and her works include "Fiesta", "Paladares", The New Spanish Table, The Greatest Dishes: Around the World in 80 Recipes, Terrific Pacific Cookbook (coauthored by John Welchman), and Please to the Table: The Russian Cookbook (coauthored by John Welchman). Mastering the Art of Soviet Cooking: A Memoir of Food and Longing from 2013 is a culinary autobiography and compact Soviet history in one. It has been translated into 19 languages.

See also
 Food writing
 Russian cuisine
 Soviet cuisine

References

External links
 Anya von Bremzen on Amazon
 Anya von Bremzen on Food & Wine
 Anya von Bremzen on Twitter
 Anya von Bremzen on NPR
 https://www.penguinrandomhouse.com/authors/32146/anya-von-bremzen

1963 births
Living people
Russian food writers
James Beard Foundation Award winners